Grevillea laurifolia, commonly known as laurel-leaf grevillea, is a species of flowering plant in the family Proteaceae and is endemic to New South Wales. It is a prostrate, trailing shrub with egg-shaped, heart-shaped or round leaves, and clusters of reddish to deep maroon flowers.

Description
The leaves sometimes have wavy edges, and the lower surface is silky-hairy.

Taxonomy
Grevillea laurifolia was first formally described in 1827 by Kurt Polycarp Joachim Sprengel in Systema Vegetabilium from an unpublished manuscript by Franz Sieber. The specific epithet (laurifolia) means having leaves similar to species of Laurus.

In 2015, Peter M. Olde described two subspecies of G. laurifolia in the journal Telopea, and the names are accepted by the Australian Plant Census:

Distribution and habitat
It grows in low-nutrient clay-, shale- and sand-based soils, either on ridges and slopes or in the vicinity of swampy areas. The habitat is open sclerophyll forest under such trees as silvertop ash Eucalyptus sieberi, Sydney peppermint (E. piperita), broad-leaved peppermint (E. dives, brittle gum (E. mannifera, red stringybark (E. macrorhyncha), brown barrel (E. fastigata) and alongside shrubs such as Mirbelia platyloboides, dense phyllota (Phyllota squarrosa), mountain geebung (Persoonia chamaepitys), myrtle geebung (P. myrtilloides) and stiff-leaf wattle (Acacia obtusifolia), or in more open woodland or heath associated with Faulconbridge mallee ash (Eucalyptus burgessiana), Blue Mountains mallee ash (E. stricta), scribbly gum (E. sclerophylla), and silver banksia (Banksia marginata).

Use in horticulture
Grevillea laurifolia adapts readily to cultivation provided it has good drainage and a sunny aspect. It can have difficulties at lower altitudes. Larger-leaved forms have been selected for horticulture and make attractive groundcover plants and can attract birds to the garden. Grevillea 'Poorinda Royal Mantle' is a vigorous cultivar that was bred by Victorian plantsman Leo Hodge and registered in 1978; it is thought to be a hybrid between G. laurifolia and G willisii. The most commonly cultivated subspecies is subsp. caleyana, because of its larger flowers.

References

laurifolia
Flora of New South Wales
Plants described in 1827
Taxa named by Kurt Polycarp Joachim Sprengel
Proteales of Australia